Ibn Bashkuwāl, he was Khalaf ibn ‘Abd al-Malik ibn Mas'ud ibn Musa ibn Bashkuwāl ibn Yûsuf al-Ansârī, Abū'l-Qāsim, (var. Ḫalaf b.'Abd al- Malik b. Mas'ūd b. Mūsā b. Baškuwāl, Abū'l-Qāsim; September 1101 in Córdoba – 5 January 1183 in Sarrión), was an influential Andalusian traditionist and biographer working in Córdoba and Seville.

Life
His ancestry was Arab and was a descendant of al-Ansar- he was known as Ibn Bashkuwāl ("son of Pasqual") in the Valencia region. His first teacher was his father (d.1139), to whom he dedicates a section in his biographical work. He studied with the most famous scholars of his time: Ibn al-'Arabī al-Ma'āfirī and the lawyer Abūl-Walīd ibn Ruschd (died 1126), the grandfather of the philosopher Averroës. In his hometown he worked as a consulting lawyer (faqīh mušāwar) and for a short time as deputy Qādī in Seville under Ibn al-'Arabī.  It appears he never travelled to the East and his scholarship derived from the Andalusian-Islamic tradition. His biographer Ibn Abbār (d. Jan 1260) mentions 41 scholars in Córdoba and Seville, with whom he studied. His library held works by authors from the Islamic East; of which is the  K. as-Siyar  from Abū Ishāq al-Fazārī, on whose title page he is documented as the owner of the work.

He died in January 1183 and was buried in the cemetery known then as Ibn 'Abbās Scholars’ Cemetery in Córdoba

Works
Ibn Bashkuwāl's biographers attribute him authorship of twenty-six known books, treatises and monographs of biographical content, and list his teachers and the texts he studied. Among his few surviving works are:

Aṣ-ṣila fī ta'rīḫ a'immat al-Andalus, ‘Continuation of the scholarly history of al-Andalus’; continuation of Ibn al-Faraḍī's (d. 1013) famous biographical dictionary of Islamic Spain's scholars, which contains 1541 biographies of 11th and 12th century Andalusian scholars. In a dedicated chapter (faṣl) he presents the life of the so-called "strangers" (al-ghurabā), who came to al-Andalus from the Orient and Ifrīqiya.
 Ibn al-Abbār (1199-1260) from Valencia wrote the supplement (Takmilat K. as-ṣila) and filled some gaps found in the original work. In the first volume he wrote a detailed biography of Ibn Baškuwāl.
 Another supplement and continuation of Ibn Baškuwāl's work was written by Ibn az-Zubair al-Gharnāṭī (1230, Jaén (Jayyān) – 1309, Granada (Gharnāṭa)) entitled ilat aṣ-ṣila  ('The continuation of the ṣila') or: 'The story of the scholars of al-Andalus, in which he (the author) of the Kitāb aṣ-ṣila continued by Ibn Baškuwāl'. This book deals with the Andalusian scholars of the 12th and 13th centuries. A fragment of the work was published by the French orientalist Évariste Lévi-Provençal in 1937 (Rabat). Three further volumes with corrections and additions to the first edition were published in 1993 (Rabat).
Kitāb ġawāmiḍ al-asmā' al-mubhama al-wāqi'a fī-'l-aḥādīṯ al-musnada,  ‘Secrets of indistinct names found in Hadiths with complete Isnads’;  two-volume biographical compilation and explanation of personal names, names of ancestry contradictorily, or incorrectly, reported in the literature.
Shuyūḥ'Abd Allāh ibn Wahb al-Qurashī, ‘Teachers of 'Abd Allāh ibn Wahb al-Qurashī’; biographical dictionary of teachers of the Egyptian scholar 'Abdallāh ibn Wahb with rich information about its importance as a primary source of Ibn Wahb. Contains an appended biography of Ibn Wahb.
Kitāb al-mustaġīṯīn bi-lāhāhi, ‘Book of the beseechers of God’; collected hadith with complete isnād traditions containing the Holy Du'ā ' intercessions. In this work Ibn Bashkuwāl cites the titles and authors of thirteen source works. At the beginning of this collection for example, the intercession of the Prophet Muḥammad in the Battle of Badr is linked to the Qur’ān verse:

Literature
The Encyclopaedia of Islam. New Edition. Brill. Leiden. Vol. 3, p. 733
 Manuela Marín (ed.):  Ibn Baškuwāl (m 578/1183): Kitāb al-mustagīṯīn bi-llāh. (En busca del socorro divino). Fuentes Arábico-Hispanas. 8th Madrid 1991.
 Carl Brockelmann:  History of Arabic Literature. 2nd Edition. Brill, Leiden 1943. Vol.1, p. 415
 Fuat Sezgin: History of Arabic Literature.  Vol.1. Brill, Leiden 1967.
 Qāsim'Alī Sa'd: Muḥaddiṯ al-Andalus al-Ḥāfiẓ al-mu'arriḫ Abū'l-Qāsim b. Baškuwāl. Šaḫṣiyyatu-hu wa-mu'allafātu-hu.  ('The Hadith scholar of al-Andalus, the historian Abū'l-Qāsim b Baškuwāl, his personality and his works'). In: Maǧallat Ǧāmi'at Umm al-Qurā li-'ulūm aš-šarī'a wa -'l-luġa al-'arabiyya wa-dābi-hā. Vol.18, n.28 (Mecca, 2003), p. 222-288 (in Arabic)

References

1101 births
1183 deaths
12th-century Arabic writers
12th-century biographers
12th-century historians from al-Andalus
Hadith scholars
Encyclopedists of the medieval Islamic world
People from Córdoba, Spain
People from Seville